Lentyevo is a rural locality (a village) and the administrative center of Lentyevskoye Rural Settlement, Ustyuzhensky District, Vologda Oblast, Russia. The population was 444 as of 2002. There are 18 streets.

Geography 
Gromoshikha is the nearest rural locality.

References 

Rural localities in Ustyuzhensky District